In 2022, Kent County Cricket Club competed in the 2022 County Championship, the 2022 One-Day Cup and the 2022 T20 Blast. The season was the sixth in charge for head coach, and former player, Matthew Walker. Sam Billings retained the club captaincy that he was first awarded in 2018. Daniel Bell-Drummond and Jack Leaning was named as vice-captains for limited overs and first-class matches, respectively.

Michael Yardy left his position as batting coach in November 2021 to return to his former county Sussex. The following month, Kent announced that former Netherlands international Ryan ten Doeschate would join the county as the new batting coach.

On 17 September 2022, Kent defeated Lancashire by 21 runs in the final at Trent Bridge to win the 2022 One-Day Cup. The victory ended a run of eight consecutive defeats in List A finals going back to their last title in 1978.

Squad

Departures
South African batsman Heino Kuhn left the club at the end of the 2021 season after four seasons with Kent.

On 20 April 2022, Grant Stewart signed a short-term loan deal with Sussex. Stewart was recalled by Kent after just one game, due to an injury sustained by Jackson Bird. On 23 May 2022, Ollie Robinson joined Durham on loan for the T20 Blast.

On 29 July 2022, Matt Milnes signed a contract to join Yorkshire at the end of the season. In August it was announced that Darren Stevens would be released at the end of the season after 17 years with Kent. Stevens played over 630 games for Kent, scored more than 28,000 runs and took almost 900 wickets. In 2021, at the age of 44, Stevens was named as one of the five Wisden cricketers of the year, making him the oldest person to be named in the list for 88 years.

On 23 September 2022, the club announced that wicketkeeper-batsman Ollie Robinson would be leaving the club at the end of the season to join Durham.

Arrivals
In October 2021, teenage bowler Jas Singh signed his first full-time contract after making his first-class debut in 2021. The same month, opening batsman Ben Compton joined Kent on a two-year contract after being released by Nottinghamshire.

In November 2021, New Zealand fast bowler Matt Henry rejoined the county after previously featuring during the 2018 season. Henry arrived at the club in July 2022 and was available for the One-Day Cup and the second half of the County Championship. In December 2021, Kent announced that Afghan spinner Qais Ahmad would return to represent the county in the T20 Blast for a second season.

In January 2022, South African international all-rounder George Linde signed on a two-year deal. In February 2022, Kent announced another overseas player, with Australia fast bowler Jackson Bird signing a short-term deal making him available at the start of the season for up to six matches in the County Championship. Bird's spell was cut short after he sustained a shoulder injury. On 7 June 2002, following injuries to other bowlers in the squad, Kent signed New Zealand seamer Jacob Duffy for a short spell. Duffy would be available for two County Championship matches. On 24 June 2022, Kent announced the signing of bowler Toby Pettman on loan from Nottinghamshire for the County Championship game against Surrey. In July, Indian fast bowler Navdeep Saini was announced as another short-term overseas player, replacing Duffy, to play up to three Championship matches and five One-Day Cup games. Saini's contract was later extended for the duration of the One-Day Cup after Matt Henry was called up to the New Zealand squad, meaning that Henry would only be available for the first game of the tournament.

On 30 July 2022, Kent signed 20 year-old Joey Evison from Nottinghamshire, initially on loan for the One-Day Cup before joining on a three-year contract from the start of the 2023 season. On 10 August 2022, batsman Harry Finch re-joined Kent for the remainder of the One-Day Cup as cover for a number of players absent due to injuries and The Hundred. Finch previously had a short-term deal with the county during the 2021 season when the squad had been severely affected by COVID-19. In October 2022, Finch signed a two-year contract to run until the end of the 2024 season.

On 16 September, with several players unavailable due to injuries and a first England call-up for Jordan Cox, Kent signed bowler Connor McKerr on loan from Surrey for the remaining two games of the season.

Squad list
 Ages given as of the first day of the County Championship, 7 April 2022.

County Championship
The County Championship will return to the two division format last used in the 2019 season. The teams were placed into the division they had qualified to following the result of the 2019 County Championship, after the 2020 season was cancelled due to the COVID-19 pandemic.

Division One

 Relegated to the Division Two.

One-Day Cup

Group A

  Advanced directly to the semi-finals
  Advanced to the quarter-finals

Quarter-final

Semi-final

Final

T20 Blast

South Group

 Advanced to the quarter-finals

Tour Match
Kent hosted a four-day first-class match against the touring Sri Lanka Cricket Development XI from 6 to 9 May 2022. This was the first of six matches for the Sri Lanka A side on their tour of England.

References

External links
Kent home at ESPN cricinfo
Kent County Cricket Club official site

2022
2022 in English cricket